Prince Nikolaus of Thurn and Taxis (later Nikolaus, Baron of Hochstadt) (21 January 1885 – 8 June 1919) was a member of the Princely House of Thurn and Taxis and a Prince of Thurn and Taxis. Nikolaus was a Lieutenant in the German Imperial Navy.

Family
Nikolaus was born in Athens, Kingdom of Greece, the eldest child and son of Prince Franz of Thurn and Taxis and his wife Countess Theresia Grimaud of Orsay. Nikolaus was an older brother of Princess Luise of Thurn and Taxis (1887–1949), Prince Gustav of Thurn and Taxis (1888–1919), Prince Egon of Thurn and Taxis (1890–1915), and Prince Franz of Thurn of Taxis (1892–1944). Through his father, Nikolaus was a grandson of Maximilian Karl, 6th Prince of Thurn and Taxis and his second wife Princess Mathilde Sophie of Oettingen-Oettingen and Oettingen-Spielberg.

Marriage

Nikolaus renounced his princely rights and title of "Prince of Thurn and Taxis" and was subsequently created "Baron of Hochstadt" by Otto of Bavaria on 19 May 1913. His renunciation of his succession rights and title followed his engagement to the Munich actress Carola Reichenberger, the daughter of a foreman of a printing shop. Because Reichenberger was "of humbler birth" than Nikolaus, his family objected to the union. It was announced that their wedding was scheduled to take place in early August 1913 and the couple wed on 3 August. Following the wedding, Nikolaus and his wife relocated to Texas in the United States.

Military career
Nikolaus entered the German Imperial Navy on 1 April 1903 where he served in the "Fürst Bismarck" unit at the rank of Ensign. By 1913, Nikolaus had attained the rank of Lieutenant.

Ancestry

References

External links
 Photograph of Prince Nikolaus of Thurn and Taxis

1885 births
1919 deaths
Nobility from Athens
Princes of Thurn und Taxis
German Roman Catholics
Imperial German Navy personnel of World War I
Military personnel from Athens